Çeltikçi is a village in Silifke district of Mersin Province, Turkey. It is situated in delta of Göksu River. The population of Çeltikçi is 297 as of 2011.

References

Villages in Silifke District